RJ Meléndez (born December 3, 2002) is a Puerto Rican basketball player who plays for Illinois Fighting Illini. He has represented the Puerto Rico men's national basketball team.

Early life 
Meléndez  was born in Arecibo, Puerto  Rico. He attended high school at Central Pointe Christian Academy in Kissimmee, Florida.    

As a junior, he averaged 18.6 points per game. He led CPCA to its first-ever SIAA state title and earned finals MVP honors. He averaged 24.3 points, 6.1 rebounds, 3.4 assists, 2.2 steals and 2.3 blocks as a senior, leading Central Pointe (CPCA) to a 33-7 record and took home Sunshine Independent Athletic Association (SIAA) Player of the Year and first-team All-SIAA.  He finished his career as CPCA’s all-time leading scorer with 2,006 points.    

His high school coach was Boricua legend Richie Dalmau.  

In high school, Meléndez was rated a four-star recruit. He was ranked No. 56 by ESPN, No. 93 by 247Sports Composite and No. 117 by Rivals. He chose Illinois over Florida, Oklahoma State, Dayton, LSU, Ole Miss, VCU, Nebraska, Virginia Tech, DePaul, Iowa State, Georgia, Georgia Tech, Alabama, St. John’s, Rhode Island, UMass, Florida Atlantic and South Florida.

College life 
As a freshman,  Meléndez  played in 22 games. He averaged 3.8 points and 1.7 rebounds.  

In a matchup versus the University of Houston in the 2022 NCAA tournament,  Meléndez  was assessed a controversial technical foul for hanging on the rim after he completed a dunk. Hall of Fame basketball player Reggie Miller, now working as a broadcaster, stated “First of all, his momentum is taking him with him, he has to swing back,” Miller said. “You cannot give this young man a technical foul for this. He’s not showing up or anything, because if he doesn’t [hang on the rim] he is going to almost kill himself. You’ve gotta swing on the rim right here.”   The dunk cut the lead to 4 in favor of Houston, but the technical foul awarded Houston free throws and the basketball. Illinois coach Brad Underwood lamented the shift in momentum caused by the call. The Cougars won the game 68–53 and moved on to their second consecutive Sweet 16.   Meléndez  provided nine points and three assists in the game.

National Team 

Melendez played in the 2019 U17 Centrobasket Championships. He averaged 9.2 points and 3.2 rebounds per game and helped Puerto Rico to a silver medal.

Personal life 
Meléndez is the son of Mariel Vega and Omar  Meléndez. He is majoring in recreation, sport and tourism.

References 

2002 births
Living people
Illinois Fighting Illini men's basketball players
People from Arecibo, Puerto Rico
Puerto Rican men's basketball players